The Gilera Ice is a scooter produced by the Italian manufacturer Gilera from 2001 to 2003 in the Piaggio Group factory of Pontedera.

History

Presented at the Bologna Motor Show in November 2000, the Gilera Ice is a sport scooter aimed at a young audience and available only in the 50 version.

Characterized by the “Axe Frame” chassis in exposed pressed steel, this solution guarantees a resistance to bending and torsion 400% higher than that of a conventional frame.
Designed by Frascoli Design, it has an aggressive line with the front shield made of recyclable plastic and liquid crystal instrumentation. 

The engine is the Piaggio 50 Hi-Per 2 “air cooled”, two-stroke with two-stage catalytic converter and Secondary Air System. The engine is Euro 1 approved. The tank has a capacity of six liters.
It features the fork with 30mm stanchions, a rear monoshock with 4-position adjustable spring preload. The braking system consists of a 190 mm front disc and a 110 mm rear drum; the rims are in 10” painted aluminum alloy with oversized tires.

Sales in Italy start in April 2001 after the presentation for road tests held at the MTV Live @Futurshow in Bologna. In the rest of Europe, sales start in summer 2001.

Due to disappointing sales it went out of production in 2003.

References

Ice
Motor scooters